Pray IV Reign is the fourth studio album by American hip hop recording artist Jim Jones, released on March 24, 2009, under E1, Columbia and Sony Music Entertainment. The album, his first not to be released under Diplomat Records, also serves as his first under a major record label. The album includes production from Ron Browz, Chink Santana, No I.D., Ryan Leslie, Michael Crawford, Triple-A and Young Seph. Jones' fourth album also features guest appearances from Ron Browz, Juelz Santana, NOE, Mel Matrix, Rell, Ludacris, Ryan Leslie, Chink Santana, Bree-Beauty, Starr, Rowana and Oshy.

Background
The album, originally titled Back 2 Back, was his first album with Columbia Records. The album cover was photographed by Thi Chien. There are several different album covers. The first version is the original cover, the second, third and fourth are all the original cover, but with different colored backgrounds, such as red, green and blue. The fifth cover is the Deluxe Edition with a close up of Jim Jones' face.

Music
In a 2008 listening session, a few tracks were revealed. The "Intro" was originally titled "Across 110th Street" and "How to Be a Boss" was originally titled "Follow this Blueprint". On the sixth track, titled "Frienemies", Jones' addresses his strained relationships with Cam'ron and Max B. "My My My" is a song he recorded  his deceased friend Stack Bundles. Jim Jones says he likes to call this track "Emotionless Pt. 2", referring to a previous single of his taken from his third album Hustler's P.O.M.E. (2006). According to Jim Jones, "My My My" is one of the hardest songs for him perform because of his emotions. The passing of friend and fellow American rapper Stack Bundles, was one of the main inspirations for the album Pray IV Reign.

A track that was rumored to be on the album was the remix to MGMT's "Electric Feel":

Release and promotion
On July 8, 2008, Jones' released a song titled "The Good Shit", featuring production from Ron Browz and a guest appearance from fellow ByrdGang member NOE. It was intended to be the album's first single when it was titled Back 2 Back, but was instead used for promotional purposes.

"Pop Champagne", a song Jones recorded with Ron Browz and Dipset cohort Juelz Santana, was leaked online in the summer of 2008. It quickly became a club banger and hit single, peaking at #22 on the Billboard Hot 100. The song was released as the album's lead single on September 4, 2008. The song proved to be Jones' second most successful single to date, behind his 2006 hit "We Fly High".

In October 2008, Jim Jones released a promotional video for the album, rapping his verse on his remix to Kid Cudi's "Day 'n' Nite". Jim Jones initially wanted to release the album on December 9, which was coincidentally the same date Jay-Z was going to release The Blueprint 3 and 50 Cent was going to release Before I Self Destruct.

To promote the album, Jones worked with Damon Dash and director J. Kyle Manzay to stage the play Hip-Hop Monologues: Inside the Life and Mind of Jim Jones. The “Hip-Hop Monologues” is a musical theatrical experience, co-written by Jim Jones, using the music from Pray IV Reign, as the platform. An ensemble of professional actors portray various characters from Jones’ past, while Jones performed his new songs in the context of a scripted story. The two-day only play pulled in a packed audience of fans, media, and celebrities. Infused with a live band the performance "Gives you that live instrumentation feel — more like a real Broadway type of feel as opposed to just seeing a hip-hop track. So, you’ll get to hear both the real music from off of the album and then the band comes in and it takes over and it gives you that really funky feeling" said Jones of the play.

On January 1, 2009 a song titled "Na Na Nana Na Na" was premiered and on February 17, was released to iTunes. It serves as the album's second single and features up-and-coming singer Brittney Taylor AKA Bree-Beauty. Jim Jones also teamed up with BET, to promote the album as well. On March 2, 2009, Jim Jones appeared on BET's 106 & Park to premiere the music video for "Na Na Nana Na Na". Later on in the show he announced that from March 2 to March 24, he would be announcing a new item out of his "Swag Bag". The goal for the fans was to keep track of all the items announced each day and once you've collected all the items, you had to log on to BET.com/JimJones on Friday, March 20 to enter the contest for a chance to win Jim Jones’ "Swag Bag". Who ever entered all 24 items correctly won the "Swag Bag" and its items.

Jones partnered with iTunes, which had a "Countdown to Jim Jones Pray IV Reign". On February 17, they released the second single "Na Na Nana Na Na". On March 3, they released "Precious" featuring vocals and production from Ryan Leslie, on March 17, the song titled "Frenemies" was released, and on March 24, the entire album was released. The lead single from Pray IV Reign, "Pop Champagne", which spent two weeks as America's #1 urban single, was also incorporated into the countdown and was already available for sale.

Reception

Critical response 

XXL gave the album a 4/5, stating that the album is an extreme improvement with many heartfelt tracks, but many disappointments. XXL complimented the lead single, "Pop Champagne", "My My My", and the promo singles "Precious" and "Frenemies", but disliked the second single "Na Na Nana Na Na", "Pop Off" and "This Is the Life".

Alex Thornton of HopHopDX liked the songs "How to Be a Boss" with Ludacris saying it stole the show, "Precious" with Ryan Leslie and "My My My". He also liked the lead single "Pop Champagne" but like most critics he hated the second single "Na Na Nana Na Na"

Commercial Performance
The album debuted at #9 on the Billboard 200 with 42,982 copies sold in its first week released.

Track listing

Notes
 "Intro" contains interpolations from the composition "Sunday and Sister Jones" written by Gene McDaniels and performed by Roberta Flack on Quiet Fire.
 "Frienemies" contains interpolations from the composition "Ballad for the Fallen Soldier" performed by The Isley Brothers.
 The instrumental for "This Is the Life" was originally used by Yung Berg & Ray J on a song titled "Exotic".
 "Jackin' Swagga from Us" contains samples elements from "Paper Planes", as performed by M.I.A., and is an alternative version of "Swagga Like Us", a collaborative song of T.I. and Jay-Z, featuring Lil Wayne & Kanye West, from T.I.'s album Paper Trail.

Chart positions

Pray IV Reign: The Mixtape

Jim Jones released a mixtape, titled Pray IV Reign: The Mixtape, on March 3, 2009 to promote the album. Most of the songs on the mixtape are tracks that failed to make the album's final track listing.

Track listing

Charts

References

2009 albums
Jim Jones (rapper) albums
E1 Music albums
Columbia Records albums
Albums produced by Chink Santana
Albums produced by Ron Browz
Albums produced by Ryan Leslie
Albums produced by No I.D.